Willow Park is a city in Parker County, Texas, United States. The population was 4,936 in 2020.

Willow Park was the location of Trinity Meadows Race Track, one of the first horse racing tracks opened once Texas legalized parimutuel betting. However, it was never seriously considered for upgrade to first-class status, and once Lone Star Park opened, Trinity Meadows Race Track closed.  It is home to Squaw Creek golf course, located just off Ranch House Road.

KTVT, Channel 11 in Fort Worth operates a 1 million watt doppler radar in Willow Park.

Geography

Willow Park is located at  (32.753808, –97.650081).

The population of Willow Park's corporate limits is 5,100.

Demographics

As of the 2020 United States census, there were 4,936 people, 1,870 households, and 1,533 families residing in the city.

Education
Willow Park is served by the Aledo and Weatherford Independent School Districts.  Trinity Christian Academy has been located in Willow Park since 1993 and serves students pre K through 12th Grade.

References

External links
 City of Willow Park
 Squaw Creek Golf Course

Cities in Parker County, Texas
Cities in Texas
Dallas–Fort Worth metroplex